Adibah Noor Mohamed Omar (3 September 1970 – 18 June 2022) was a Malaysian singer, actress and master of ceremonies. She made her start in the entertainment industry in 1995 and had gone on to star in films such as Sepet and Gubra.

Early life and career 
Born in Kuala Lumpur, Adibah was a teacher who taught English as a second language and was previously a graduate of the National University of Malaysia. Her first singing competition was in a talent show called Suara 90-an Nescafe, where she won first place in 1994.

Career

2005–2010: Terlalu Istimewa, Cahaya
In 2006, Adibah released her first album entitled "Terlalu Istimewa". The album featured an eponymous song, a ballad written in response to the rape and gruesome murder of a 10-year-old girl that took place in Johor Bahru in January 2004. The album garnered critical acclaim and six nominations for the 13th Anugerah Industri Muzik, as well as Best Ballad and Best Vocal in the 21st Anugerah Juara Lagu.

2011–2022
To celebrate her 22 years in the entertainment industry, Adibah planned to hold a mini concert named 'Into The 3rd Decade' to take place on 21 and 22 October at KLPAC, Kuala Lumpur. Adibah also served as a judge for a singing competition talent show for Astro titled Duo Star.

On 24 February 2017, it was revealed that Adibah would release her third full album Jiwa Sentuh Jiwa in March. The album, containing eight tracks, would include collaborations with singer like Misha Omar, Anuar Zain, Amir Jahari, Nassier Wahab, Dina Nadzir and Sam Innuendo among others.

Death 
Adibah died at Gleneagles Hospital Kuala Lumpur on 18 June 2022 due to her fourth-stage ovarian cancer. She was 51 years old. She was buried at Taman Keramat Permai Muslim Cemetery, Hulu Kelang, Selangor.

Filmography

Films

Television series

Television movies

Radio

Commercials

Discography

Studio albums 
Terlalu Istimewa (2005)
Teman (2010)
Jiwa Sentuh Jiwa (2017)
Kecurigaan (2022)
Setulus Rasa (2022)

Other singles 
Zapin Cinta SMS (duet with Senario)
Appy Thots (featuring Doul)
Hujan (theme song of Mukhsin)
Bahasa Rindu (duet with Nizam)

Awards and nominations 
 Anugerah Juara Lagu 2006 (Best Vocal) - Adibah Noor
 Anugerah Juara Lagu 2006 (Ballads Category) - "Terlalu Istimewa"
 Anugerah Juara Lagu 2006 (Best Song) - "Terlalu Istimewa"
 Hits 1 Akhir 2007 (Overall Winner) - "Terlalu Istimewa"
 Hits 1 Akhir 2007 (Best Performance) - "Terlalu Istimewa"

References

External links 
 
 
 Laman web rasmi

1970 births
2022 deaths
Deaths from ovarian cancer 
Deaths from cancer in Malaysia
Malaysian people of Malay descent
Malaysian actresses
Malaysian women pop singers
Malaysian Muslims
Malaysian television personalities
Malay-language singers
Malaysian rhythm and blues singers
21st-century Malaysian women singers
National University of Malaysia alumni